Miley Cyrus is an American singer, songwriter, and actor. Cyrus rose to prominence for starring as the title character in the Disney Channel series Hannah Montana. Cyrus has released six studio albums Meet Miley Cyrus (2007), Breakout (2008), Can't Be Tamed (2010), Bangerz (2013), Miley Cyrus & Her Dead Petz (2015) and Younger Now (2017) and she released the EP The Time of Our Lives (2009). In 2008, Cyrus was nominated for a Golden Globe for Best Original Song and won the MTV Movie Award for Best Song From A Movie with her song "The Climb" in 2009. She received 16 nominations at the World Music Awards in 2014 and 50 Teen Choice Award nominations from 2006 to 2014, making her the most nominated person in the history of the Teen Choice Awards.

Awards and nominations

Other accolades

World records

Notes

References

Awards
Lists of awards received by American musician
Lists of awards received by American actor